SET domain containing 1B is a protein that in humans is encoded by the SETD1B gene.

Function

SET1B is a component of a histone methyltransferase complex that produces trimethylated histone H3 at Lys4 (Lee et al., 2007 [PubMed 17355966]).[supplied by OMIM, Mar 2008].

References

Further reading